The Roman Catholic Church in Mozambique is composed of three ecclesiastical provinces and 9 suffragan dioceses.

List of dioceses

Episcopal Conference of Mozambique

Ecclesiastical Province of Beira
Archdiocese of Beira
Diocese of Chimoio
Diocese of Quelimane
Diocese of Tete

Ecclesiastical Province of Maputo
Archdiocese of Maputo
Diocese of Inhambane
Diocese of Xai-Xai

Ecclesiastical Province of Nampula
Archdiocese of Nampula
Diocese of Gurué
Diocese of Lichinga
Diocese of Nacala
Diocese of Pemba

External links 
GCatholic.org.

Mozambique
Catholic dioceses